Danville National Cemetery is a United States National Cemetery located in the city of Danville, in Vermilion County, Illinois. Administered by the United States Department of Veterans Affairs, it encompasses , and as of 2014, it had 12,000 interments.

History

In 1897, Congress established a soldiers home called the National Home for Disabled Volunteer Soldiers in Danville, and the next year the cemetery was established on a small plot of land nearby to inter those veterans who died while under care in the facility. In 1901 a new cemetery was plotted, and the interments were all moved to their current location. It was transferred to the National Cemetery system in 1973.

Danville National Cemetery was listed on the National Register of Historic Places in 1992.

Notable monuments
 The Soldiers Monument, by William Clark Noble, a granite base with a bronze statue of a Civil War soldier holding a musket, dedicated in 1917.

Notable interments
 Lieutenant Morton A. Read, Medal of Honor recipient for action at the Battle of Appomattox Courthouse during the Civil War.

References

External links
 National Cemetery Administration
 Danville National Cemetery
 
 

Cemeteries in Illinois
Historic American Landscapes Survey in Illinois
Protected areas of Vermilion County, Illinois
United States national cemeteries
1898 establishments in Illinois